Miroslav Knapek (born 3 March 1955) is a retired Czech rower. He competed in the coxless pairs at the 1976 and 1980 Summer Olympics and placed sixth and fifth, respectively. His daughter Miroslava Knapková also became a rower and won the single sculls event at the 2012 Olympics.

References

1955 births
Living people
Olympic rowers of Czechoslovakia
Rowers at the 1976 Summer Olympics
Rowers at the 1980 Summer Olympics
Czech male rowers
Sportspeople from Brno